Bignonia noterophila is a flowering plant species in the genus Bignonia. It is native from south Mexico to northern South America.

References 

noterophila
Plants described in 1945